Nalule Asha Aisha kabanda is a Ugandan politician and the Women's Representative in parliament for Butambala for the National Unity Platform.

Personal Detail. 
Aisha Kabanda is married to Omar Kalinge-Nnyago, a research and learning manager for Uganda's Wasafiri consulting firm. The couple has 10 children.

Career details. 
Aisha Kabanda started her work as a Kampala Resident City Commissioner. She resigned, and joined the race for the Butambala district Women's Representative in 2021. She holds the position of deputy secretary general for the National Unity Platform.  Kabanda is married to Omar Kalinge Nyango.

See also 
National Unity Platform

List of members of the eleventh Parliament of Uganda

External links 
Butambala District local government

References. 

Women members of the Parliament of Uganda
Members of the Parliament of Uganda

Year of birth missing (living people)
Living people
21st-century Ugandan women politicians
21st-century Ugandan politicians
People from Butambala District
National Unity Platform politicians